Alberto Lanteri (born 11 January 1938) is an Argentine fencer. He competed at the 1964 and 1968 Summer Olympics.

References

1938 births
Living people
Argentine male fencers
Argentine sabre fencers
Olympic fencers of Argentina
Fencers at the 1964 Summer Olympics
Fencers at the 1968 Summer Olympics
Sportspeople from La Plata
Pan American Games medalists in fencing
Pan American Games silver medalists for Argentina
Fencers at the 1967 Pan American Games